Air transport network or air transportation network (ATN) is an example of transport networks and spatial networks. The nodes of the network are the airports and the links represent direct flight routes between two airports. Alternatively, cities can be considered as the nodes with links representing direct flight connection between them. Air transport networks can be defined worldwide as well as for one region or for one airline company; the scale of the network can be global or domestic.

Properties of air transport networks
The graph of an air transport network is spatial but not a  planar graph. The air transportation network is a complex network which has the properties of small-world networks and scale-free networks.  The degree distribution of the nodes displays a heavy-tailed distribution. The hubs of the network have large connectivities and long-distance connectivities at the same time.

An anomalous property of the air transport networks is that nodes with relatively low degrees may have very high betweenness centrality. It is an important observation related to the robustness of complex networks. According to this finding the critical points of the system are not necessarily the hubs, but some other cities which uniquely provides routes to certain regions. For example, Alaska can be easily isolated from the other parts of the worldwide air transport network.

The worldwide air transport network defines communities. These communities are mainly determined by geographical factors. However, in some cases the borders of the communities are different from the borders of geographic regions. Such an example is the community of Europe and Asian Russia.

Examples for air transport networks
The worldwide air transportation network is represented by the database of International Air Transport Association (IATA). The worldwide air transportation network is a critical infrastructure with high impact on mobility, trade and economy.

Another examples are the air transport systems of a country or a country's own air transport company. It is particularly important, because the quality of the airports and national airlines are also the measures of the state of development of the country.

Application of air transport networks
Modeling air transport networks aims airline companies to organize their routes in a cost-efficient way and therefore maximize their profits. Air transport network models are also the tool to investigate system robustness. They help to determine weaknesses of the system in case of various kinds of disruptions. Once weaknesses are determined, a substitute node which can support all or part of the traffic load can be identified through the alternative strength for the pair.   

An alternative application is modeling human disease networks. Air transport network is used by millions of people every day, therefore it plays key role in the spread of some infections, such as influenza or SARS. In this sense air transport network is a transmitter similar to sexual networks, which is liable for the spread of AIDS and other sexually transmitted diseases.

See also
 Flow network
 Geometric graph
 Air transportation in the United States
 Global shipping network

References

External links 
 Airport database over world airports
 Official Airline Route Maps

Networks
Civil aviation